The Sanremo Music Festival 1966 was the 16th annual Sanremo Music Festival, held at the Sanremo Casino in Sanremo, province of Imperia between 27 and 29 January 1966.

The show was presented by Mike Bongiorno, assisted by  Paola Penni e Carla Maria Puccini. Gianni Ravera served as artistic director.

According to the rules of this edition every song was performed in a double performance by a couple of singers or groups. The winners of the Festival were  Domenico Modugno and Gigliola Cinquetti with the song "Dio, come ti amo".

Participants and results

References 

Sanremo Music Festival by year
1966 in Italian music
1966 music festivals